Vann Vannak was a popular actor in Cambodia during the late 1960s until 1975. Despite his talents, producers usually favored casting his rivals Kong Som Oeurn or Chea Yuthorn in their movies. Due to their lack of support, Vann Vannak starred in considerably fewer films when compared to his rivals. Nevertheless, he was pivotal in movies such as Sovann Pancha, Neang Kakey, and Champa Meas all of which had Vichara Dany as the female lead. To increase his presence in the industry he created his own production company known as Pisnoka in 1970 which made eight films casting himself as the male lead in all of them.

Details of his life are relatively unknown and he is believed to have died under the Khmer Rouge regime. Of all the films he has starred in, only Sovann Pancha is known to have survived and remained intact.

Partial filmography 
 Sdach Damrey Sor
 Bey Sach Sorng Sek
 Phno Bey Leu Dey Kror
 Sro Our Samdey Srey Am
 Veal Srey Our Sror
 Chhean Entry Khmav
 Kror Mom Chol Mlob
 Neang Kev Nama
 Neang Sork Kror Ob
 Dav Roeung Neang Sovan Sakor
 Neang Kakey
 Neang Sovan Ten Orn
 Phka Thkol Meas
 Champa Meas
 Sovann Pancha
 Proleng Polikam
 Kone Krok Khmav 1
 Kanseng Loheth
 Chav Chab Kdam
 Kone Krok Khmav 2
 Dav Bak Dorng Meas Broyuth
 Dev Chhveng Sdam

References 

 

Cambodian male film actors
Year of birth missing
20th-century Cambodian male actors
People who died in the Cambodian genocide
Possibly living people